Sandia Knolls is a census-designated place (CDP) in Bernalillo County, New Mexico, United States. The population was 1,208 at the 2010 census. It is part of the Albuquerque Metropolitan Statistical Area.

Geography
Sandia Knolls is located in northeastern Bernalillo County, at the southern end of a small mountain known as Monte Largo, east of the Sandia Mountains.

Demographics

Education
It is zoned to Albuquerque Public Schools.

References

Census-designated places in Bernalillo County, New Mexico
Census-designated places in New Mexico
Albuquerque metropolitan area